Little India, Edison/Iselin, also known as Oak Tree Road, is a predominantly South Asian shopping, business, and dining district centered on a road, designated County Route 604, situated in Middlesex County, in Central New Jersey, and set amidst a suburban residential region home to many South Asian families. One food and entertainment critic has named the "atmospheric" Little India as one of the "50 Best Reasons to Live in New Jersey."

Location

Little India on Oak Tree Road runs for about one-and-a-half miles through Edison and neighboring Iselin, New Jersey. The epicenter of Little India retail is traditionally on the two-block stretch of Oak Tree Road between Correja Avenue and Middlesex Avenue in Iselin, an area officially known as India Square; there, as of 2017, rents were roughly double over the rest of the strip. The intersection of Wood Avenue and Oak Tree Road is where the two towns meet.

Little India is located in Central Jersey in Middlesex County, the U.S. county with the highest concentration of Indian Americans.
This zone is the largest and most diverse South Asian ethnic enclave and cultural hub in the United States. According to the 2017 American Community Survey, 42.6% of Iselin residents identified themselves as being Asian Indian, the highest for any census-designated place in the United States.

The area is served by Metropark Station, providing a one-seat commuter rail connection to Penn Station in Midtown Manhattan.

Some have lamented the stroad status of parts of the strip as inhibiting ideal walkability from establishment to establishment, and have advocated for improved sidewalks.

Culture, cuisine, and commerce

Oak Tree Road in Edison and Iselin is home to over 400 South Asian business establishments, including dining, halal grocery, jewelry, apparel and electronics retailing, and entertainment. Many come to the area for its traditional gold and Maharashtrian jewelry retailers.  Indian-American supermarket chain Patel Brothers has a location on the strip.

Over 145 Indian restaurants alone are found in the neighborhood. Establishments have appeared on food critics' "best of South Asian cuisine" national and regional lists. The district, which lies nears the sprawling Chinatown, Edison, is also known in particular as a destination for Indo-Chinese cuisine.

The actor-comedian Omi Vaidya celebrated the Oak Tree Road scene and South  Asian culture in his 2020 song "Oak Tree Road," a parody of Old Town Road.

In 2023, Tanishq, the luxury Indian jewelry brand, opened its U.S. flagship store on Oak Tree Road.

History

Oak Tree Road has a long history in commerce. It is named for a large oak tree which stood at a crossroads where a market was located during the Revolutionary War era. This crossroads and surrounding area was the site of the Oak Tree Engagement during the Battle of Short Hills.  It was a relatively rural area in the early to mid 20th century.

In the early 1990s, prior to the arrival of significant Indian investment, Oak Tree Road was a down-on-its-luck strip of biker bars and abandoned buildings.
Some late-1980s-era economic pioneers to the then-rundown strip experienced racism from the locals, which largely subsided by the early 1990s. The first Navratri festival in the state of New Jersey was held in the area in 1991.
As Indian businesses began arriving in the 1990s en masse, the area transformed over time into the "thriving market full of pedestrian traffic on weekends" seen today.

By 2022, the Indian population was approaching one-third of the population of Monroe Township in southern Middlesex County, and the nickname Edison-South had developed, in reference to the Little India stature of both townships in Middlesex County.

Festivals and events
A blend of South Asian religious festivals and cultural events are held in the Little India district in Edison and Iselin, each featuring a melting pot of visitors and celebrants of all religions and backgrounds.

India Day Parade on Oak Tree Road

A major annual event on the road is the India Day Parade. The annual New Jersey India Day Parade, hosted by the Indian Business Association, is held every August on Oak Tree Road to celebrate Indian Independence Day. Celebrants such as Governor Phil Murphy start in Edison at Cinder Road and march eastbound towards Iselin, finishing the parade at India Square in Iselin. In 2022 as in other years, local officials attended, including Speaker Craig Coughlin, U.S. Congressman Frank Pallone, New Jersey state senator Patrick J. Diegnan, Assemblyman Robert Karabinchak, Mayor John McCormac, and Edison mayor Sam Joshi.

In 2022, controversy and concerns about anti-Muslim animus arose when members of the community objected to a yellow wheel loader, resembling a bulldozer, seen in the August 14 parade displaying photographs of Prime Minister Modi and the conservative Hindu nationalist monk, Yogi Adityanath, who is also the chief elected leader of the Northern Indian region of Uttar Pradesh.
 Modi and Adityanath are both members of the right-leaning Bharatiya Janata Party, a major Indian political party. The 2022 Oak Tree Road parade's grand marshal, Sambit Patra, is the national spokesperson for the same party. The yellow construction vehicle displayed at the 2022 parade included a placard with the words "Baba ka bulldozer" written in Hindi. This display was a reference to the monk's nickname, both affectionately and pejoratively, of "Bulldozer Baba" (roughly equivalent to "Father Bulldozer," "Saint Bulldozer" or "Bulldozer Monk")
for his extensive use of the machine in demolishing structures.

Other festivals and events
 Ganesh Utsav. Every year the weeklong festival honoring the Hindu deity Ganesha draws thousands of celebrants to nearby Woodbridge Mall.
 Diwali. Celebrations for Diwali, the Hindu festival of lights, are held annually on Oak Tree Road and surroundings.
 Holi, the Hindu festival of colors, is also celebrated with the use of color and dancing at events on Oak Tree Road.
 Eid. Visitors and the Desi Muslims in the Oak Tree Road area celebrate the Eid religious festivals twice a year with feasts and celebrations: Eid al-Fitr at the end of Ramadan and Eid al-Adha later in the year.
 Christmas. The Indian Business Association sponsors a Christmas tree lighting and celebratory festival with Santa Claus annually.
 Navratri. A large Navratri festival is held annually in the area, in most recent years at the NJ Expo Center at Raritan Center. Jack Ciattarelli attended in 2021.

Houses of worship
A variety of Hindu temples have been established along the strip, alongside diverse Christian, Jewish, and Muslim congregations in the greater area. Shirdi Sai Cultural and Community Center is one such temple. Located on the Iselin side of the district, it is devoted to the 19th century Indian saint Sai Baba of Shirdi.

See also

 Chinatown, Edison
 Curry Hill in Midtown Manhattan
 Curry Row in Lower Manhattan
 Ethnoburb
 List of neighborhoods in Edison, New Jersey
 List of neighborhoods in Woodbridge Township, New Jersey
 List of county routes in Middlesex County, New Jersey
 India Independence Day Parade
 Indians in the New York City metropolitan region
 India Square
 Overseas Indians

References 

Roads in New Jersey
Asian-American culture in New Jersey
Indian-American culture
Little Indias
Edison, New Jersey
Ethnic enclaves in New Jersey
Ethnic enclaves in the United States
New Jersey culture
Tourist attractions in New Jersey
Indian-American culture in New Jersey
Neighborhoods in Woodbridge Township, New Jersey
Neighborhoods in Edison, New Jersey
South Asian American culture
American

Indian diaspora in the United States
Pakistani diaspora in the United States